The Bridle Path is a residential neighbourhood in Toronto, Ontario, Canada. It is characterized by large multimillion-dollar mansions and two to four acre (8,000 to 16,000 m²) lot sizes. It makes up part of Bridle Path–Sunnybrook–York Mills. Often referred to as "Millionaires' Row",  it is the most affluent neighbourhood in Canada, with an average household income of $936,137, as well as by property values with an average dwelling value of $2.24M.

Although "The Bridle Path" is in fact the name of a road in the area, the term generally applies to the neighbourhood as a whole. It is bounded by The Bridle Path on the north, Sunnybrook Health Sciences Centre on the south, Bayview Avenue on the west and Wilket Creek on the east. Few roads pass through the area, contributing to the area's exclusivity. House prices in the Bridle Path are varied, but most are well in excess of a million dollars.  It is a secluded neighbourhood, surrounded by the Don River Valley and lush parklands.

History

The Bridle Path was little more than farmland until 1929, when the Bayview Bridge was constructed across the steep (West Branch) Don River Valley.  It was at that point that the area was first considered for residential development.  Forsey Page, a Toronto-based land developer, envisioned the Bridle Path as an "exclusive enclave of estate homes" and he built the neighbourhood's first home, a Cape Cod Colonial style home at 2 The Bridle Path. This house is credited as the catalyst for the development of the neighbourhood.

In 1937, developer E.P. Taylor, who designed the Don Mills community, purchased a large plot of land north of the Bridle Path. The estate, named Windfields by his wife, is occupied today by the Canadian Film Centre. The park through which Wilket Creek flows behind this parcel of land is known as Windfields Park. In the late forties, Taylor's business partner George Montegu Black, Jr (father of Conrad Black) moved into the area and built a large mansion on Park Lane Circle. The area was subdivided into about 50 lots, each selling for $25,000 at the time, and through the Fifties it began to take shape.

In July 1948, Sunnybrook Military Hospital was opened to the south of the neighbourhood. The hospital was since reorganized into Sunnybrook Health Sciences Centre, and has expanded to encompass much of Bridle Path's southern boundary.

In the 1950s and 1960s, local architects such as James A. Murray, Jerome Markson, Brook and Banz, and Seligman & Dick built many modern houses in the Bridle Path. Many of these have now been replaced with larger houses.

The Bridle Path has been home to prominent Toronto business people, celebrities, doctors, and engineers. Media mogul Moses Znaimer used to call the Bridle Path home, as did computer businessman Robert Herjavec. Former newspaper baron and convicted felon, businessman Conrad Black was owner of a familial residence until 2016 when he sold the 26 Park Lane Circle, North York for $16.5 million. Prince bought a house in the Bridle Path in the early 2000s.  "Casino King of Macau" Stanley Ho bought a house in the Bridle Path in 1987 for a then-high $5.5 million. Rapper Drake built a house there in the late 2010s.

A location in the Bridle Path was used in the movie Mean Girls as Regina George's house and another house was used for the movie It Takes Two.

Education

Two public school boards operate elementary schools in Bridle Path, the separate Toronto Catholic District School Board (TCDSB), and the secular Toronto District School Board (TDSB). TCDSB operates St. Bonaventure Catholic School, and TDSB operates Park Lane Public School. Neither school board operates a secondary school in the neighbourhood; secondary schools for both TCDSB and TDSB are in adjacent neighbourhoods.

Two French first language public school boards also provides schooling for applicable residents of Bridle Path, the secular Conseil scolaire Viamonde (CSV), and the separate Conseil scolaire catholique MonAvenir (CSCM). Neither operates a school in the neighbourhood, with CSV and CSCM students attending schools in other neighbourhoods in Toronto.

The neighbourhood has one public post-secondary institution, Glendon College. The college is a federated campus of York University, operating as a bilingual liberal arts college.

In addition to public institutions, the neighbourhood is also home to several private schools, including Crescent School, an elementary and secondary private school.

Recreation

The neighbourhood includes several municipal parks and green spaces, including Edwards Gardens, Sunnybrook Park, and Windfields Park. Edwards Gardens is a botanical garden located in the east of the neighbourhood. Many of these parks are situated near the Don Valley, which forms a part of the larger Toronto ravine system. Municipal parks in Bridle Path are managed by the Toronto Parks, Forestry and Recreation Division.

Transportation
Several major roadways pass through the neighbourhood, including Bayview Avenue, a north–south thoroughfare, and Lawrence Avenue, an east–west thoroughfare. The neighbourhood's namesake comes from a residential road, The Bridle Path. The actual "Bridle Path" name came about as early plans for the neighbourhood included an elaborate system of equestrian bridle paths, as most of the estate owners in the area preceding its development were horse-owners.

Public transit is provided by Toronto Transit Commission (TTC), operating bus routes around the neighbourhood.

Popular Culture 

 The neighbourhood is the namesake for resident Drake's song “7am On Bridle Path” off his 2021 studio album Certified Lover Boy.

References

External links

Map of the Rich 
Area history, by Mike Filey

Neighbourhoods in Toronto
North York